The 2000–01 Algerian Championnat National was the 39th season of the Algerian Championnat National since its establishment in 1962. A total of 16 teams contested the league, with CR Belouizdad as the defending champions, The Championnat started on September 7, 2000. and ended on June 25, 2001.

Team summaries

Promotion and relegation 
Teams promoted from Algerian Division 2 2000–2001 
 CA Bordj Bou Arreridj
 RC Kouba

Teams relegated to Algerian Division 2 2001–2002
 USM El Harrach
 CS Constantine

League table

Result table

Season statistics

Top scorers

References

External links
2000–01 Algerian Championnat National

Algerian Championnat National
Championnat National
Algerian Ligue Professionnelle 1 seasons